Walcott is an unincorporated community in central Carbon County, Wyoming, United States.  It lies along local roads near Interstate 80 and the concurrent U.S. Routes 30 and 287, east of the city of Rawlins, the county seat of Carbon County.  Its elevation is 6,627 feet (2,020 m).  It had a post office with the ZIP code of 82335, that closed in 2007.

Public education in the community of Walcott is provided by Carbon County School District #2.

References

Unincorporated communities in Carbon County, Wyoming
Unincorporated communities in Wyoming